Margania is a Georgian surname. Notable people with the surname include:

Vladimir Margania (1928–1958), Georgian and Soviet football player
Zurab Margania, Chairman of the State Security Service of Abkhazia

Georgian-language surnames